George Armytage may refer to:
George Armytage (politician) (1734–1783), British politician and the third of the Armytage baronets
George Armytage (grazier) (1795–1862), grazier in Australia
Sir George Armytage, 5th Baronet (1660–1736) of the Armytage baronets in the Baronetage of England
Sir George Armytage, 4th Baronet (1761–1836) of the Armytage baronets
Sir George Armytage, 5th Baronet (1819–1899) of the Armytage baronets
Sir George John Armytage, 6th Baronet (1842–1918) of the Armytage baronets
Sir George Ayscough Armytage, 7th Baronet (1872–1953) of the Armytage baronets

See also
George Armitage (disambiguation)
Armytage